The XRV750 Africa Twin was a  dual-sport first launched in December 1989. and based on the Honda NXR-750, which won the Paris-Dakar rally four times in the late 1980s (from 1986 to 1989).

Description and technical

It was preceded by Honda XRV650 Africa Twin, which was a lighter, higher specification version made in 1988 and 1989 by Honda Racing Corporation with a 650 cc engine producing . The much earlier Honda XLV750R was a shaft driven motorcycle.

Built in homage to the giant desert racers of the Paris-Dakar Rally, the Africa Twin is a large, dual sport bike, powered by a softly tuned V-twin engine. It has twin headlights, a windscreen, and a long dual seat which stretches back from the tank to an aluminium grabrail and plastic coated luggage rack. An aluminium bashplate protects the bottom of the engine from flying rocks and impacts.

The engine is a 742 cc, liquid-cooled V-twin with SOHC 6-valve and four spark plug. The long-travel suspension insulates the rider from uneven surfaces. The brakes are twin discs at the front and single disc at the rear.

History and update 

In December 1989 the original Honda XRV750 Africa Twin was launched, which became known as the 1990 model. In 1990 was updated. In 1992 the Tripmaster computer was added. In 1993 the motorcycle had a major redesign including new frame, body work plastics, fuel tank, engine modifications and a lower seat. Nevertheless, it gained weight slightly. In 1996 the XRV gained an improved seat and clutch, larger silencer, modified upper fairing and luggage rack. However, the rear shock absorber lost some of its adjustability. In 2000 the Honda XRV750 Africa Twin ceased production. XRVs still in the showrooms were sold and registered until 2003 but there is no XRV with a VIN that is newer than 2000. Nowadays good second hand examples are very much sought after among aficionados. Several aftermarket products exist with which to equip the bike such as crash bars to protect the vehicle's plastics and tank from damage in a low speed fall.

The later XRV's instruments feature a large trip computer LCD display mounted above the conventional speedometer and tachometer, styled like Dakar racers' navigational displays, and incorporates a range of extra electronic timers and trip meters.

Specifications

References

External links 

 Partial history update of XRV750 on honda.co.jp
 Test 1992: Cagiva Elefant vs Honda Africa Twin vs BMW R 100 GS vs Yamaha XTZ 750

XRV750
Dual-sport motorcycles